This is a discography for Canadian country music group Prairie Oyster.

Studio albums

1980s

1990s

2000s

Compilation albums

Singles

1980s

1990s

2000s

Music videos

Notes

A^ "Man in the Moon" peaked at number 54 on the Canadian RPM Country Tracks chart.

References

Discographies of Canadian artists
Country music discographies